Benjamin, Ben, Benny or Bennie Green may refer to:

Composers and musicians
Bennie Green (1923–1977), American jazz trombonist 
Benny Green (saxophonist) (1927–1998), English broadcaster, music and cricket writer
Benny Green (pianist) (born 1963), American hard bop jazz teacher
Ben Green (composer) (born 1964), Israeli producer and songwriter
Ben Green (musician) (born 1964), American singer and songwriter
Ben George Christian Green (born 1964), English heavy metal bassist, known as G.C., co-founder of Godflesh

Sportsmen
Benny Green (footballer) (1883–1917), English inside-forward
Ben Green (cricketer) (born 1997), English right-arm bowler

Others
Benjamin Green (merchant) (1713–1772), Colonial Canadian administrator and judge
Benjamin Richard Green (1807/8–1876), English watercolour painter and author
Benjamin Green (c. 1811–1858), English architect who partnered with his father as John and Benjamin Green
Ben Charles Green (1905–1983), American federal jurist
Ben K. Green (1912–1974), American writer about Southwestern horses
Ben Green (comedian) (born 1973), English actor and comedy writer
Ben Green (mathematician) (born 1977), English professor at Oxford
Ben Green (producer), British media and podcast producer since 2000s

Characters
Benny Green, teenage drama pupil played by Terry Sue-Patt on BBC's Grange Hill in 1978–1982

See also
Benjamin Greene (disambiguation)